

Heinz Furbach (27 September 1895 – 23 October 1968) was a German general n the Wehrmacht of Nazi Germany during World War II. He was also a recipient of the Knight's Cross of the Iron Cross.

Awards and decorations
 Iron Cross (1914) 2nd Class (10 November 1914) & 1st Class (26 September 1916)
 Wound Badge (1914) in White (5 May 1918)
 Knight's Cross of the House Order of Hohenzollern with Swords (26 April 1918)
 Honour Cross of the World War 1914/1918 (30 December 1934)
 Wehrmacht Long Service Award 2nd Class (2 October 1936)
 Clasp to the Iron Cross (1939)  2nd Class (20 May 1940) & 1st Class (27 May 1940)
 Knight's Cross of the Iron Cross on 4 October 1942 as Oberst and commander of Infanterie-Regiment 58

References

Citations

Bibliography

 
 

1895 births
1968 deaths
People from Gryfino County
People from the Province of Pomerania
Major generals of the German Army (Wehrmacht)
German Army personnel of World War I
Prussian Army personnel
Recipients of the Knight's Cross of the Iron Cross
German prisoners of war in World War II held by the United States
Reichswehr personnel
Recipients of the clasp to the Iron Cross, 1st class